Amma is a genus of kelp fly in the family Coelopidae.

Species
Amma blancheae McAlpine, 1991

References

Coelopidae
Sciomyzoidea genera